Midway is an unincorporated community in Crockett County, Tennessee, United States.

References

Unincorporated communities in Crockett County, Tennessee
Unincorporated communities in Tennessee